Sag Harbor is a 2009 novel by author Colson Whitehead.

Sag Harbor takes place in Sag Harbor, a small village in the exclusive Hamptons on the east end of New York's Long Island. The novel's main character is Benji, an African American teenager spending the summer in a black enclave of his predominantly white and close-knit town along with his brother Reggie. Set in 1985, the novel touches on themes of race, class, and commercial culture.

Plot
School's finally out for the summer and the return to Sag Harbor is in full swing. Teenage brothers Benji and Reggie Cooper escape their majority white preparatory academy in Manhattan. Still clad in Brooks Brothers polos and salmon colored pants, the pair re-meet all of their friends. Like most well-to-do kids at their families' beach houses during the summer, most of the teens in Sag Harbor go almost the entire season with virtually no contact from their parents (aside from occasional visits on the weekends). The lack of authority allows for plenty of interesting run-ins. Benji constantly remakes himself to become the coolest in town.

Characters
Benji Cooper
Reggie Cooper, Benji's brother
Various friends in Sag Harbor: Clive, Marcus, Bobby, Randy, NP

Analysis
According to Touré's New York Times review of the book, Sag Harbor speaks to a new generation of wealthy young blacks. In the wake of the election of President Barack Obama and the success of other African Americans in the national spotlight, this story of a wealthy black teenager depicts a situation – "black boys with beach houses" – that was however paradoxical when it took place, in 1985. Himself the son of wealthy parents, the novel is a fictional account of Whitehead's life at that time. The 2009 publication of Sag Harbor coincides with what Touré terms the post-black period, when blacks are less noticed for their color and more for their public achievements.

Colson Whitehead wanted to take up a different path in writing Sag Harbor, a novel named after the town in which he used to vacation with his family. In a January 2009 Wall Street Journal article, Whitehead said, "Having written a string of books that were heavy on the ideas and social critique, I wanted to try something more modest and personal." His previous books, The Intuitionist and John Henry Days, are quite different from Sag Harbor in style and genre. Sag Harbor is a very personal depiction of Whitehead's own life as a teenager, giving the novel a much more vibrant context, as Whitehead depicts, in fiction, his own experiences including young love, young hate, and even pop-culture events of 1985 such as New Coke.

Release details
2009, USA, Bantam Doubleday Dell , pub. date 28 April 2009, hardback first edition

Honors 
 Finalist, PEN/Faulkner Award for Fiction
 Finalist, Hurston-Wright Legacy Award

TV series 
In August 2021, it was reported that a television series adaptation of the novel was in development at HBO Max. The project will be produced by Boat Rocker Media with Laurence Fishburne as executive producer.

References

2009 American novels
Novels by Colson Whitehead
African-American novels
Fiction set in 1985
Novels set in Long Island
Sag Harbor, New York
Doubleday (publisher) books
PEN/Faulkner Award for Fiction-winning works